Brain Donor are an English power trio, formed in July 1999 by Julian Cope and two Spiritualized members, Doggen Foster (lead guitar) and drummer Kevin 'Kevlar' Bales. Wearing full make-up in the kabuki style of early KISS, the band seek to combine Van Halen-esque heavy metal with garage rock in the style of Blue Cheer and the Japanese noise rock bands High Rise and Mainliner.

The band's debut album Love Peace & Fuck was hammered by the press for its gratuitous soloing and guitar heavy production. But with the recent return of heavy metal values to underground music via re-appraissals of Blue Cheer and Sir Lord Baltimore, Love Peace & Fuck has since come to be regarded by the new American Underground as something of a classic,} and a US compilation album of the band was released in 2005, on San Francisco's Mister E. Records. The same year, a song entitled "Messages" from the second Brain Donor album, Too Freud To Rock 'n' Roll, Too Jung To Die, appeared in the American film, The Lost.

Bales has since been replaced by new drummer, known as Mr. E.

Discography

Albums
Love Peace & Fuck CD/double vinyl (Impresario, 2001)
Too Freud to Rock 'n' Roll, Too Jung to Die CD (Brain Donor Records, 2003)
Brain Donor US Compilation (Mister E, 2005) 
Drain'd Boner (Invada, 2006)
Wasted Fuzz Excessive (Brain Donor Records, 2009)

Singles
"She Saw Me Coming"  (Impresario, 2001)
"Get Off Your Pretty Face" (Impresario, 2001)
"My Pagan Ass" (Static Resonant, 2002)

References

External links

Interview with Julian Cope about Brain Donor

English glam metal musical groups
English hard rock musical groups
British musical trios